The Eagle Square is the main square in Abuja, the capital of the Federal Republic of Nigeria. It is located between the Head of Service and the Federal secretariat buildings in the Central Business District of Abuja. Its name "Eagle Square" comes from the fact the square has an eagle shape. It is directly across from the Tomb of the Unknown Soldier.

History 
The square was constructed in 1999 to serve as the central area for seats of power in Nigeria. In January 2012, the Occupy Nigeria protest took place on the square.

Eagle Square is used as the main venue for the Independence Day parade and the Swearing-in Ceremony of the President of Nigeria. Since its completion, it has also hosted a number of political rallies, religious programmes, musical concerts, and award ceremonies.

Landmarks and Facilities 

Eagle Square is conveniently located near major government buildings and landmarks within Abuja.

 Abuja International Conference Centre
 Federal Secretariat
 National Cenotaph
 National Assembly
 Supreme Court

Facilities in the Eagle Square include:
 VIP pavilion 
 Over 2500 seats in covered terraces
Stand-by generators
 2 entrance gates 
 Parking Garage

The Parking Garage is located behind the square and is designed to accommodate about 300 cars.

See also
 Abuja
 National Assembly Complex
 Inauguration of Muhammadu Buhari
Nigerian presidential inauguration
 Aso Villa
 Federal Capital Territory, Nigeria
 Supreme Court of Nigeria

References

Squares in Nigeria
Buildings and structures in Abuja
Tourist attractions in Abuja
Parade grounds